The 2015 Oceania Youth Athletics Championships were held at the Barlow Park in Cairns, Queensland, Australia, between May 8–10, 2015. They were held together with the 2015 Oceania Area Championships. Detailed reports on a day by day basis were given.

Initially, a total of 44 events were scheduled. However, results for girl's pole vault and mixed 800m sprint medley relay could not be retrieved. The events were most probably cancelled resulting in a total of 42 contested events, 22 by boys and 20 by girls.

Medal summary
Complete results can be found on the Oceania Athletics Association webpage.

Boys (U18)

Girls (U18)

Mixed

Medal table (unofficial)

Note: Totals include both individual and team medals, with medals in the team competition counting as one medal.

Participation (unofficial)
According to an unofficial count, 127 athletes from 16 countries and territories participated.  
As in the years before, there was also a "Regional Australia Team" Northern Australia (dubbed "RAT" in the results list) comprising Australian athletes who either have their normal place of residence (defined as being a place where an athlete is resident and/or educated) in an "athletically remote area" of Australia (defined as a being a place more than 300km from any centre at which track and field competition is held on a regular basis i.e. basically weekly or fortnightly during the track season) or "Northern Australia" (defined as comprising the Northern Territory and any parts of Western Australia and North Queensland, north of 26th parallel south latitude).

References

Oceania Youth Athletics Championships
Oceania Youth Athletics Championships
Oceania Youth Athletics Championships
International athletics competitions hosted by Australia
2015 in youth sport
May 2015 sports events in Australia